Tainia, commonly known as ribbon orchids or 带唇兰属 (dai chun lan shu) is a genus of about thirty species of evergreen, terrestrial orchids in the (family Orchidaceae) distributed from India, China, Japan, Southeast Asia to New Guinea, the Solomon Islands and Queensland.

Description
Orchids in the genus Tainia are evergreen, terrestrial herbaceous plants with upright, crowded, thin fleshy pseudobulbs. Each pseudobulb has a single, smooth or pleated leaf. The flower stalk emerges from the pseudobulb on the top of a leafless shoot and bears resupinate yellowish, brownish, red or purple small to moderately large flowers. The sepals and petals are similar in size and shape to each other and several flowers open simultaneously. The labellum is sometimes lobed but always has prominent ridges on its upper surface.

Taxonomy and naming
The genus Tainia was first formally described in 1825 by Carl Ludwig Blume who published the description in Bijdragen tot de flora van Nederlandsch Indië. The name Tainia is an Ancient Greek word meaning "ribbon", "fillet", "band" or "stripe"  but Blume's reason for giving this name is not known.

Species list
The following is a list of the species of Tainia currently accepted by the World Checklist of Selected Plant Families as of October 2014:

 Tainia acuminata Aver. 
 Tainia bicornis (Lindl.) Rchb.f.
 Tainia cordifolia Hook.f. - Vietnam, Taiwan, Fujian, Guangdong, Guangxi, Yunnan
 Tainia cornuta Aver.
 Tainia crassa (H.Turner) J.J.Wood & A.L.Lamb - Peninsular Malaysia
 Tainia dunnii Rolfe - Fujian, Guangdong, Guangxi, Guizhou, Hainan, Hunan, Jiangxi, Sichuan, Taiwan, Zhejiang
 Tainia dunnii var. caterva (T.P.Lin & W.M.Lin) T.P.Lin
 Tainia elliptica Fukuy
 Tainia hennisiana (Schltr.) P.F.Hunt - Myanmar
 Tainia hualienia S.S.Ying - Taiwan
 Tainia latifolia (Lindl.) Rchb.f. - Assam, Bangladesh, India, Bhutan, Laos, Myanmar, Thailand, Vietnam, Borneo, Java, Sumatra, Hainan, Taiwan, Yunnan 
 Tainia latifolia subsp. elongata (J.J.Sm.) H.Turner - Sumatra, Java, Borneo
 Tainia latifolia subsp. latifolia  - Assam, Bangladesh, India, Bhutan, Laos, Myanmar, Thailand, Vietnam, Hainan, Taiwan, Yunnan 
 Tainia latifolia subsp. subintegra P.O'Byrne - Assam, Bangladesh, India, Bhutan, Laos, Myanmar, Thailand, Vietnam, Hainan, Taiwan, Yunnan 
 Tainia laxiflora Makino - Japan, Taiwan, Izu-shoto, Nansei-shoto (Ryukyu Islands)
 Tainia longiscapa (Seidenf.) J.J.Wood & A.L.Lamb - Yunnan, Thailand, Vietnam, Hainan
 Tainia macrantha Hook.f. - Guangxi, Guangdong, Vietnam
 Tainia maingayi Hook.f. - Java, Borneo, Malaysia, Sumatra
 Tainia marmorata (J.J.Sm.) J.J.Wood & A.L.Lamb - Sulawesi
 Tainia megalantha (Tang & F.T.Wang) ined. - India, Bhutan, Assam
 Tainia minor Hook.f. - Assam, India, Nepal, Bhutan, Myanmar, Yunnan, Tibet
 Tainia obpandurata H.Turner - Sumatra, Borneo
 Tainia papuana J.J.Sm. - New Guinea, Solomons
 Tainia paucifolia (Breda) J.J.Sm. - Thailand, Vietnam, Borneo, Malaysia, Java, Sumatra 
 Tainia ponggolensis (A.L.Lamb ex H.Turner) J.J.Wood & A.L.Lamb - Sabah
 Tainia purpureifolia Carr - Borneo
 Tainia scapigera (Hook.f.) J.J.Sm. - Borneo
 Tainia serratiloba Ormerod - western New Guinea
 Tainia simondii (Seidenf. ex Aver.) ined. - Vietnam
 Tainia speciosa Blume - Thailand, Malaysia, Borneo, Java, Sumatra 
 Tainia trinervis Blume Rchb.f. - Maluku, New Guinea, Solomons, Queensland 
 Tainia vegetissima Ridl. - Malaysia, Borneo
 Tainia wrayana (Hook.f.) J.J.Sm. - Sikkim, Bhutan, Assam, Thailand, Vietnam, Malaysia, Sumatra

Distribution and habitat
Orchids in the genus Tainia grow in high rainfall, shady forests. They are found in Sri Lanka, India and Japan, then south from Myanmar to New Guinea, Australia and some Pacific Islands. Thirteen species, of which two are endemic are found in China. The only Australian specis, T. trinervis also occurs in New Guinea and some Pacific Islands.

References

 
Collabieae genera